Swigart is a surname. Notable people with the surname include:

Oad Swigart (1915–1997), American baseball player
Oral Swigart (1897–1973), American naval officer and wrestler
Rob Swigart (born 1941), American novelist, poet, short story writer, futurist, and archaeology scholar

Americanized surnames